The Scottish Charity Regulator (OSCR) is a non-ministerial department of the Scottish Government with responsibility for the regulation of charities in Scotland.

OSCR is the independent regulator and registrar for more than 24,000 Scottish charities. OSCR is charged with developing a regulatory framework for Scottish charities, where each charity is clear about is rights and responsibilities. This framework should also foster public confidence in charities. OSCR is directly answerable to the Scottish Parliament. OSCR is based in Dundee.

Background
In 1981 the Law Society of Scotland announced support for a register through which all charities in Scotland could record their purposes, financial details and accounts. Under section 6 of the Law Reform (Miscellaneous Provisions) (Scotland) Act 1990, the Lord Advocate was given the power to make enquiries either for general or specific purposes and to obtain various types of information from charities. Following the Scotland Act and the establishment of both the Scottish Parliament and the Scottish Government this power was exercised by the Scottish Ministers.

Initially charity regulation was carried out by the Scottish Charities Office, a department in the Crown Office, but they were only able to investigate a charity on receipt of a complaint or when they had reasonable grounds to suspect problems. The regulatory function was transferred to OSCR in December 2003.

History
It was formerly an executive agency but following the passing of the Charities and Trustee Investment (Scotland) Act 2005 it was made independent of ministerial control, and answers directly to the Scottish Parliament. It is the equivalent of the Charity Commission for England and Wales and the Charity Commission for Northern Ireland.

In 2005, OSCR published the first definitive list of 18,000 charities operating in Scotland – this information was searchable.

OSCR's full regulatory powers came into force on 24 April 2006.

In July 2008, OSCR published results of a survey showing some positive attitudes towards the organisation from the charity sector and the public.

Functions
The OSCR perform a range of functions which includes:

 Determining whether bodies are charities.
 Keeping a public Register of charities.
 Facilitating compliance by charities with the legislation.
 Investigating any apparent misconduct in the administration of charities.
 Giving information or advice to Scottish Ministers.

OSCR also has a role to protect whistleblowers from detrimental treatment. Under the Public Interest Disclosure Act 1998, OSCR is a "prescribed person" and therefore allowed to accept disclosures from people who carry out paid work for a charity.

References

External links

 
Non-ministerial departments of the Scottish Government
Organisations based in Dundee
2003 establishments in Scotland
Government agencies established in 2003
Charity regulators
Regulators of Scotland